Set Point is a 2004 Estonian film directed by Ilmar Taska.

Cast
 Carmen Kass as Älis  
 Priit Võigemast as Kristofer 
 Maria Avdjuško as Evelin 
 Peter Franzén a Harri
 Veikko Täär as Leo
 Helen Mahmastol as Tennis Player
 Ivo Uukkivi as Kuldar
 Oleg Rogatchov as Oleg
 Ülle Kaljuste as Waitress
 Ksenja Agarkova as Helen
 Rain Simmul as Markus
 Margus Prangel as Policeman 1
 Tarmo Muld as Policeman 2
 Igor Netshajev as Policeman 3
 Margus Tohter as Surveyor
 Üllar Saaremäe as The Pimp

References

External links
 
 Täna öösel me ei maga, Estonian Film Database (EFIS)

2004 films
Estonian thriller films
Estonian-language films